Wild Horse Stampede is a 1943 American Western film directed by Alan James and starring Ken Maynard and Hoot Gibson, who play marshals with their own names in the manner of Gene Autry and Roy Rogers.  It was the first of eight Monogram Pictures "The Trail Blazers" film series, replacing the studio's Range Busters series.

Plot

Cowboys Hoot Gibson and Ken Maynard try to help newly appointed sheriff Bob Tyler.  The Army needs a herd of horses to help protect the new railroad line from Indian attacks, but bad guy and town boss Carson tries to stop the delivery.  Gibson, Maynard, and Tyler must save the day.

Cast 
Ken Maynard as U.S. Marshal Ken Maynard
Hoot Gibson as U.S. Marshal Hoot Gibson
Betty Miles as Betty Wallace 
Bob Baker as Marshal Bob Tyler 
Ian Keith as Carson 
Si Jenks  as Rawhide 
Robert McKenzie as Puckett 
John Bridges as Colonel Black 
Kenneth Harlan as Borman 
I. Stanford Jolley as Commissioner Brent 
Forrest Taylor as Marshal Cliff Tyler 
Kenne Duncan as Hanley 
Glenn Strange as Henchman Tip 
Tom London as Henchman Westy 
Reed Howes as Henchman Tex  
Foxy Callahan as Henchman 
Chick Hannan as Bartender 
Tex Palmer as Henchman

Production
With many actors called up for World War II, Monogram Pictures began a series starring two older but still popular Western stars, Hoot Gibson and Ken Maynard.  Maynard recalled Monogram offered each of them $600 per film.  When Maynard remarked to Gibson that the pair of them should lose some weight for the film, Gibson replied "For the kind of money we're gettin' I ain't missin' no desserts".

Notes

External links 

1943 films
1943 Western (genre) films
Monogram Pictures films
American black-and-white films
American Western (genre) films
Films directed by Alan James
1940s English-language films
1940s American films